Melaku Worede is a geneticist and agronomist of Ethiopian origin renowned for building one of the finest seed conservation centers in the world, employing science to benefit poor farmers, and saving Africa's seeds from oblivion. 

Melaku Worede was born in 1936, in Shewa, Ethiopia, to Kegnazmach Worede Gebrekidan, an Ethiopian Shewan patriot and aristocrat from Bulga, and Woizero Amsale Wodajeneh, a Shewan noblewoman of the House of Sofane and daughter of Fitawrari Wodajeneh Awgechaw, an army commander and viceroy of Ras Lul Seged in Ethiopia's former Solomonic dynasty Kingdom.

Education and career 
Melaku travelled to the US in the 1960s to pursue post-graduate studies. After obtaining a PhD in Agronomy (Genetics and Breeding) from the University of Nebraska, he returned to Ethiopia and became involved in the planning of the Plant Genetic Resources Centre in Addis Ababa, of which he became Director in 1979. He held this post until his retirement in 1993 to join the Seeds of Survival Programme of Ethiopia, which he founded with the support of a consortium of Canadian NGOs led by the Unitarian Service Committee (USC/Canada).

Melaku Worede was awarded the Right Livelihood Award in 1989 "for preserving Ethiopia's genetic wealth by building one of the finest seed conservation centres in the world."

Ethiopia is one of the world's eight 'Vavilov Centres' noted for its great genetic diversity. It is this bio-diversity - now under great threat from drought and modern farming methods - that Worede has sought to preserve. Further, the Plant Genetic Resources Centre (PGRC) set out to establish 'Strategic Seed Reserves' of traditional varieties that could be released to farmers for planting in times of drought when no other seeds were likely to thrive. In only a few years, Worede and his staff collected and safely stored a considerable amount of Ethiopia's genetic wealth. In the process, he established not only Africa's finest facility of its kind but also one of the world's premier genetic conservation systems. Worede built this institution exclusively with Ethiopian staff, training a whole new generation of plant breeders and geneticists in his home country.

Worede retired from government service to continue and develop his pioneer work on a farming-based native seed (landrace) conservation, enhancement and utilisation. Growing without commercial fertilisers or other chemicals, the locally adapted native seeds developed in this way (e.g. durum wheat) have been shown to exceed their high-input counterparts on the average by 10-15% and the original farmers' cultivars by 20-25% in yield.

Worede has been active in the training of several gene bank curators and many other young scientists. Several initiatives to support biodiversity conservation and utilisation in Africa take the Ethiopian experience as their model and are thus attributable to Worede's ground-breaking work.

Also very active at the international level, Worede was the first chair of the African Committee for Plant and Genetic Resources and has been instrumental in the setting up of the African Biodiversity Network. He has served as chair of the UN Food and Agriculture Organization's Commission on Plant Genetic Resources and is currently a board member of (among others) the International Plant Genetic Resources Institute (IPGRI) and the Rural Advancement Foundation International (RAFI). In 2008 the National Green Award Foundation, headed by the Ethiopian president, gave Worede the Outstanding International Contribution Award.

Melaku features in the film Seeds of Freedom which was released in June 2012, and features narration from Oscar-winning actor Jeremy Irons. The film was produced by The Gaia Foundation and the African Biodiversity Network, both organisations with whom Melaku has been a long term ally and worked alongside to lead a number of trainings with Field Officers working across Africa. Melaku has three children: Mary Worede, H/Mariam Melaku Worede and Lij Tedla Melaku Worede.

References

1936 births
Living people
Ethiopian scientists
Agronomists
University of Nebraska alumni